Sodemo Moteurs is a motor vehicle engine tuning company based in Magny-Cours, near Nevers, France, owned by Guillaume Maillard.

Formed in 1981, and based within the ground of the Circuit de Nevers Magny-Cours, Sodemo is most associated with the tuning of Renault engines for performance and motor racing purposes. Sodemo Moteurs is perhaps best known for its preparation of two litre racing engine for Formula 3.

The firm has also been associated with the engine tuning of Alfa Romeo and Mercedes touring car engines and Range Rover rally raid engines and has worked with WilliamsF1 to win the British Touring Car Championship with Renault Laguna touring cars. Pescarolo Sport has also used Sodemo in preparation of its 24 Hours of Le Mans sportscars.

The company also designed a series of liquid-cooled V2 aircraft engines.

Engines
Sodemo V2-1.0
Sodemo V2-1.2

References

External links
 Corporate site

Automotive motorsports and performance companies
Automotive companies of France
Vehicle manufacturing companies established in 1981
French brands
Everspeed
Companies based in Bourgogne-Franche-Comté